The 2017 season was CAPS United F.C.'s 12th season in the Zimbabwe Premier Soccer League.

Transfers

In 

|-
|}

Out

Squad

Competitions

Zimbabwe Premier Soccer League

Results summary

Results by round

Matches

Squad statistics

Appearances and goals

References

CAPS United F.C.